Charles Ichabod Wright (18 September 1828 – 9 May 1905) was a British banker and Conservative politician who sat in the House of Commons from 1868 to 1870.

Wright was born at Bramcote, Nottinghamshire the son of the scholar Ichabod Charles Wright and his wife Theodosia Denman. He was educated at Windlesham House School, Eton College and Christ Church, Oxford. His great grandfather had founded a bank and Wright became a banker in the firm of I and IC Wright & Co.  He also served for many years in the volunteers in Robin Hood Rifles, of which he became lieutenant colonel. He was also a J.P. for Nottinghamshire.

Wright was elected as one of the two Member of Parliament (MPs) for the constituency of Nottingham at the 1868 general election. He resigned from parliament in 1870, due to ill health, by the procedural device of accepting the appointment as Steward of the Chiltern Hundreds.

In 1871 Wright was living at Heathfield Hall, Burwash, Sussex where his father died. Wright owned Watcombe Park between Newton Abbot and Torquay (now known as Brunel Manor) where he and his family were living in 1881.  Later he was living at Hartendale Frensham Surrey, where he died at the age of 76. He was buried at the church of St Thomas on the Bourne Farnham.

Wright married Blanche Louise Bingham, eldest daughter of Henry Bingham, in 1852.

References

External links 
 

1828 births
1905 deaths
Wright family of Nottingham
Military personnel from Nottinghamshire
Sherwood Foresters officers
Conservative Party (UK) MPs for English constituencies
UK MPs 1868–1874
People from Bramcote
People educated at Windlesham House School
People educated at Eton College
Alumni of Christ Church, Oxford
People from Burwash
British bankers
Burials in Surrey
19th-century British Army personnel